Bistcho Lake is a large lake in northwestern Alberta, Canada.

It is the third largest lake in Alberta.

Bistcho Lake is located in the hydrographic basin of the Liard River, to which it is connected by the Petitot River. The waters of the lake drain to the Arctic Ocean through the Petitot, Liard and Mackenzie River.

The Jackfish Point and Bistcho Lake indian reserves of the Dene Tha' First Nation are established on the southern shore of the lake.

See also
List of lakes in Alberta

References

Bistcho
Mackenzie County